Johannes Christiaan Karel Klinkenberg (1852, The Hague – 1924, The Hague), was a 19th-century Dutch painter.

Biography
According to the RKD he was a pupil of Christoffel Bisschop (1828-1904) and Louis Meijer, and became a member of the Pulchri studio who later won many prizes.
A street is named after him in the neighborhood of streets named after 19th and 20th century Dutch painters in Overtoomse Veld-Noord, Amsterdam.

References

Johannes Christiaan Karel Klinkenberg on Artnet

1852 births
1924 deaths
Artists from The Hague
19th-century Dutch painters
Dutch male painters
20th-century Dutch painters
19th-century Dutch male artists
20th-century Dutch male artists